Mohammad Zeynali (born 26 June 1997) is an Iranian footballer who played as a defensive midfielder for Iranian club Sepahan in the Persian Gulf Pro League.

References

Living people
1997 births
Association football forwards
Iranian footballers
Iran international footballers
Sepahan S.C. footballers
Gol Gohar players
People from Urmia